The Giolitti V government of Italy held office from 15 June 1920 until 4 July 1921, a total of 384 days, or 1 year and 19 days.

Government parties
The government was composed by the following parties:

Composition

References

Italian governments
1920 establishments in Italy
1921 disestablishments in Italy